Cheeese is a European hidden camera show for children on Nickelodeon in Sweden, Germany, Denmark, Austria, Switzerland, and the Netherlands. The series is a spinoff of Just for Laughs: Gags.

Broadcast 
The show premiered on 13 August 2012 on Nickelodeon. From 29 September 2012 to 21 October 2012, Cheeese was also seen in Germany and Austria on Saturday and Sunday at 8:00pm. Later, the show was also broadcast in Norway and Poland. Just in Poland the show is at the moment shown on TV.

References

Nickelodeon original programming